The 2021 Cork Premier Senior Football Championship was the second staging of the Cork Premier Senior Football Championship and the 133rd staging overall of a championship for the top-ranking Gaelic football teams in Cork. The draw for the group stage placings took place on 29 April 2021. The championship began on 20 July 2021 and ended on 28 November 2021.

Nemo Rangers entered the championship as the defending champions, however, they failed to make it out of the group stage after suffering two defeats. Ilen Rovers were relegated after being beaten by Carrigaline in a playoff.

The final was played on 28 November 2021 at Páirc Uí Chaoimh in Cork, between Clonakilty and St. Finbarr's, in what was their second ever final meeting and their first in 11 years. St. Finbarr's won the match by 0-14 to 0-13 to claim their tenth championship title overall and a first title since 2018. 

Steven Sherlock was the championship's top scorer with 3-41.

Team changes

To Championship

Promoted from the Cork Senior A Football Championship
 Éire Óg

From Championship

Relegated to the Cork Senior A Football Championship
 Bishopstown

Participating teams

Clubs

The seedings were based on final group stage positions from the 2020 championship.

Divisions and colleges

Results

Group A

Table

Results

Group B

Table

Results

Group C

Table

Results

Divisional/colleges sections

Round 1

Round 2

Semi-final

Final

Relegation stage

Playoff

Knockout stage

Quarter-finals

Semi-finals

Final

Championship statistics

Top scorers

Overall

In a single game

Miscellaneous

 Clonakilty qualify for the final for the first time since 2009.

References

External link

 Cork GAA website

Cork Premier Senior Hurling Championship
Cork
Cork Senior Football Championship